Pakistan competed at the 2014 Summer Youth Olympics, in Nanjing, China from 16 August to 28 August 2014.

Field hockey

Pakistan qualified a boys team by winning the Boys U16 Asia Cup.

Boys' Tournament

Roster

 Mubashar Ali
 Muhammad Atiq
 Muhammad Sheraz Hafeez
 Shan Irshad
 Muhammad Junaid Kamal
 Muhammad Bilal Mahmood
 Nohaiz Malik
 Sikandar Mustafa
 Mohammad Azfar Yaqoob

Group Stage

Quarterfinal

Crossover

Fifth and sixth place

Shooting

Pakistan was given a quota to compete by the tripartite committee.

Individual

Team

Swimming

Pakistan qualified one swimmer.

Boys

Weightlifting

Pakistan has received tripartite invitation.

Boys

References

2014 in Pakistani sport
Nations at the 2014 Summer Youth Olympics
Pakistan at the Youth Olympics